Chankanai or Changanai  is a town located 12 km north-west of the city of Jaffna, Sri Lanka. Popular market known as Chankanai Chanthai (in Tamil Chankanai Market) is located in there. It is so popular, the immigrant community in Toronto, Canada has opened a market with the same name in their new country.

Geography

Chankanai is surrounded by Nitchamam, Thottilady, Sandilipay, Kattudai, Sittankerni.

Etymology

It is believed that the name Chankanai originated from its market roots. This was a famous trading place. The measurements used for rice in old era were "Changazhi" "Nazhi" and "Uzhi". The name originated from a combination of these three measuring containers.

There is a similar place name found in Kerala is known as Changanassery. Both the places are related with markets and trading places.

References

Towns in Jaffna District
Valikamam West DS Division